The Siemens C651 is the second generation electric multiple unit rolling stock in operation on the North–South and East–West lines of Singapore's Mass Rapid Transit (MRT) system, manufactured by Siemens (SIE) under Contract 651. A total of 114 cars consisting of 19 train-sets were purchased in 1992 and introduced into service from 1995 onwards. These trains were built by Siemens in Austria. They are well known for their unique propulsion, which makes a melodic and noticeable sound.

Design

Initial design 
The trains have a full white body and a thick red stripe in the middle. Similar to the Kawasaki Heavy Industries C151 trains, the Siemens C651 trains have no visual passenger information systems but have a built-in audio announcement system until STARiS was installed and activated around 2010.

Unlike the 66 first generation Kawasaki Heavy Industries C151 train sets, the C651s are delivered with a scratch-resistant acrylic finish. This alleviated the difficulty of removing dirt trapped on the exterior surface, as opposed to the aluminium finish of the C151 trains that were delivered unpainted. The train run number at the front of the train was delivered by a low-power consumption electronic green flip-dot display.

The C651 trains were originally delivered with a GTO-VVVF propulsion system that was supplied by Siemens.

Other original features included specifically designed air-conditioning vents that eliminate dripping from the cooling system to the train compartments, as well as an event recorder, which records important train functions, such as braking and emergency operations to assist troubleshooting in an event of a failure.

The C651 was also the basis for the Taipei Metro C321 and Taipei Metro C341 built from 1998 to 1999 and 2003 respectively for the Taipei Metro Bannan Line, as well as those used on Kaohsiung Metro.

Operational history
The design and supply of the C651 trains were tendered in December 1992 to complement the 66 first generation C151 trains with the opening of the Woodlands extension, at a cost of $259 million. These trains began revenue service from 2 May 1995, with the first train set delivered to the Mass Rapid Transit Corporation (MRTC) of Singapore on 20 September 1994. These trains are capable of being deployed on both the North–South and East–West lines at all times. However, in practice, the C651 fleet usually operates exclusively on one line under normal operations. The C651 fleet has been spread around across multiple lines from 1995 to 2019.

Since 2 November 2019, nearly all of the C651 trains in service (201/202, 207/208, 213/214, 215/216, 221/222, 223/224, 233/234 and 237/238) were reallocated to operate on the East–West Line with the opening of the Canberra station, as its existing STARiS Displays were not updated to include Canberra station in its STARIS route maps but only one or two trains were operated on the North–South Line during weekdays peak hour.

Experimental programmes 
A number of experimental programmes have been run on the C651 cars.

In the 2000s, the third and fourth cars, coloured in green had all but eight seats, four at each end of the car, removed completely. In its place was standing room with upholstered cushion, in an attempt to provide a degree of comfort to passengers standing in that space. This design proved to be unpopular with the commuters, and it was eventually dropped. The original seats between the 1st and 2nd door and the 3rd and 4th door on these cars have been replaced. The remaining upholstered seats were reverted to original seats in May 2006. All C151 trains have had their seats on the middle part of carriage removed.

Some trainsets were reconfigured to have more standing space in the late 1990s as part of an experimental programme. In particular, the second and fifth cars (the blue cars) were reconfigured to have more standing room on both sides of a seat row, as 3 seats from some later cars.

More grab poles were also added to some cars. Regular grab poles in the centre of each car were replaced by grab poles that branch out into three in the centre, first in 2007, followed by triplicated hand grips and grab poles in 2014. Special non-slip floorings were also tested.

Refurbishment and retirement
In 2015, refurbishment contracts for the 19 C651 train sets were awarded to Singapore Rail Engineering (SRE). When completed, these upgrades would have addressed components such as doors and brakes that have been the primary cause of delays owing to train faults. The changes planned included re-signalling, refurbishing the propulsion system, air-conditioning system, auxiliary power system, interior saloon with modifying handrails, replacement of the gangway connections and improving the exterior of the trains. Upgraded trains would also have had sensors that carry vital information on the train's state of health for improved operation and maintenance of the train set.

Refurbishment works had begun in January 2016, starting with train set 217/218. The refurbished trains would also have included STARIS version 2.0, which consists of dynamic route map displays. 
In September 2018, SMRT announced that refurbishment works were abruptly terminated for the C651 mid-life upgrading project. At the time of project termination, refurbishment works were conducted on three prototype trainsets and testing works had not been fully completed. In December 2019, Toyotron has been awarded the contract for disposal of old SMRT trains. On 6 September 2020, the first C651 train went for scrap. All refurbished trains were scrapped by May 2021 and currently, only 11 of them are scrapped. 4 cars from one of the C651 trainsets has been sent to Singapore Police Force for training purposes. On 28 September 2020, the LTA announced that these trains will be replaced by R151 from Bombardier Transportation (Alstom) to progressively replace the 19 C651 trainsets together with the 21 C751B trainsets from 2024 onwards.

These are the trains that are preserved:

Train formation
The configuration of a C651 in revenue service is DT–M1–M2+M2–M1–DT

The car numbers of the trains range from x201 to x238, where x depends on the carriage type. Individual cars are assigned a 4 digit serial number. A complete six-car trainset consists of an identical twin set of one driving trailer (DT) and two motor (M) cars permanently coupled together. For example, set 225/226 consists of carriages 3225, 1225, 2225, 2226, 1226 and 3226.

 The first digit identifies the car number, where the first car has a 3, the second has a 1 & the third has a 2.
 The second digit is always a 2, part of the identification numbers
 The third digit and fourth digit are the train identification numbers. A full-length train of 6 cars has 2 different identification numbers. For example 225/226 (normal coupling) or 216/226 (cross-coupling).
 Siemens built sets 201–238.

References

External links

 Manufacturer's Information for C651, Siemens AG

Mass Rapid Transit (Singapore) rolling stock
Siemens multiple units
Train-related introductions in 1995
750 V DC multiple units